Full Metal Jousting is an American reality game show that debuted on the History Channel on February 12, 2012. The show featured 16 contestants, split into two teams of eight, competing in full-contact competitive jousting, a combat sport developed by host Shane Adams since the late 1990s. One by one, the contestants were eliminated tournament-style until only one remained. That contestant received a $100,000 grand prize.

Gameplay
Each episode features full-contact jousts in which competitors charge each other on horseback and collide at around 30 miles per hour.  Unlike choreographed jousting familiar to many from dinner theater entertainment, the show featured authentic competitive jousting.

Show
Full Metal Jousting aired its first season (10 episodes) from February to April 2012.  The first season was filmed over 38 days in October and November 2011 at Providence Hill Farm in Jackson, Mississippi.

A grand prize of $100,000 was awarded to the tournament winner.  However, in Season 1, Episode 4 it was revealed that a $25,000 prize would be awarded as well.  In the finale, each team chose one of its eliminated members to compete head-to-head for this additional prize.

Casting
Casting for the show began in the summer of 2011 with a casting deadline of July 20, 2011.  Candidates were required to be at least 21 years of age, proficient in horseback riding, and a resident or citizen of the United States of America.

Around 600 people, including both men and women, applied.  30 applicants were accepted to a week-long boot camp led by the host, Shane Adams, at the end of which the producers and host eventually settled on the final 16 competitors,
aged between 23 and 43. Out of those  16 competitors, five were theatrical jousters working at Medieval Times and another six were professional horsemen (trainers or sportsmen).

Full Metal Jousting is produced by Pilgrim Studios, which conducted a casting search via its website.

Contestants

Episodes

Preliminary jousts

Tournament bracket

After the preliminary jousting completed, three players from the Black team and five players from the Red team advanced into the quarterfinals.  The host and coaches decided the quarterfinal match-up, and the rest of the season continued as a single-elimination tournament.

 Since both players were from the Black team, for visual clarity during this match Knowles' score was designated as Gold.
 Since both players were from the Red team, for visual clarity during this match Nodar's score was designated as Silver.

$25,000 joust
In Season 1, Episode 4 it was revealed there would also be a $25,000 prize awarded.  Each team was asked to nominate one member of their team, not already in the finals, who would compete prior to the final joust.

The Black team decided on two players they felt deserved to be in the $25,000 joust, Rope Meyers and Jack Mathis.  For their final decision they had a coin toss.  The coach for the Black Team, Rod Walker, was asked to flip a coin, and prior to the coin toss Jack Mathis was asked to call it; he chose "tails".  The toss was "heads", and Rope Meyers was in the $25,000 joust for the Black Team.

The Red team decided to hold a secret ballot.  There were two votes for David Prewitt, two votes for Josh Avery, and three votes for John Stikes who would now face Rope Meyes in the $25,000 joust for the Red Team.

Rope Meyers won the $25,000 joust with a score of 6 to 2.

Reception
The show premiered on February 12, 2012 to a total of 1.9 million viewers.  The numbers since the premiere have been stable, ranging from 1.2 million viewers to 1.7 million viewers. The finale was reported to have drawn 1.44M viewers for a .5 share.

References

External links
{{official website|https://web.archive.org/web/20120604055743/http://www.history.com/shows/full-metal-jousting%7D%7D
Providence Hill Farms - Season 1 Filming Location

History (American TV channel) original programming
2012 American television series debuts
2010s American reality television series
Jousting
2012 American television series endings